Henok Goitom (born 22 September 1984) is a former professional footballer who played as a centre-forward, currently assistant manager of AIK. 

He spent most of his 18-year career with AIK (two spells) and in Spain, where he played 215 matches and scored 42 goals across both major levels – 109 games and 14 goals in La Liga. He also competed professionally in Italy and the United States.

Born in Sweden, Goitom represented Eritrea as a senior after having appeared for Sweden at youth level. He made his debut for the former in 2015, earning four caps in four years and scoring once.

Early life
Goitom was born in Solna, Stockholm, and raised in the nearby Husby district. His parents were born in Eritrea.

Club career

Udinese
Goitom moved to Italy in 2004 to join Udinese Calcio, rarely being an option during his short stay. However, in his sole Serie A appearance, on 19 February 2005, he only needed seven minutes as a late substitute to score the 90th minute 1–1 equaliser against Inter Milan.

Subsequently, Goitom served a two-year loan in the Spanish Segunda División with Ciudad de Murcia. He netted 15 league goals during his second season.

Murcia
Goitom was released by Udinese in 2007, and signed a four-year deal with neighbouring Real Murcia for a reported €3 million; the president of UD Almería, Alfonso García, however, announced the club would take matters to court: as he appeared before the media during the presentation of Aitor López Rekarte, showed journalists papers which proved an agreement had already been reached between Almería and Udinese. He only scored twice during the entire campaign, which saw the team relegated from La Liga as last.

In July 2008, Goitom was loaned for one season to fellow league side Real Valladolid, which had an option to buy at the campaign's closure. Established as first choice, he netted twice in a 3–2 away win over Recreativo de Huelva on 8 March 2009, but was also sent off during the match (as teammate Álvaro Rubio). He finished as team top scorer, at ten.

Almería
In late July 2009, Goitom was released by Murcia and joined fellow league side Almería, replacing Sevilla FC-bound Álvaro Negredo. His season output consisted of one goal, in a 1–1 home draw against CD Tenerife. Also, even though he was the only pure striker in the squad, he was never an undisputed starter, but the Andalusians retained their top-division status in the end.

Goitom scored one of Almería's most important goals on 19 January 2011, a penalty kick in a 3–2 victory at Deportivo de La Coruña (4–2 on aggregate), with them reaching the semi-finals of the Copa del Rey for the first time ever; he added one more in the competition, against Real Sociedad. However, he again only netted once in the league, in a 2–2 home draw with Atlético Madrid, and the club returned to the second tier after four years.

In mid-August 2012, Goitom terminated his contract.

AIK
On 16 August 2012, Goitom signed with his hometown club AIK Fotboll in the Allsvenskan. In November 2015, it was announced he would be released when his contract ended on 31 December.

Getafe
On 22 March 2016, after being unemployed for almost three months, Goitom agreed to a short-term deal at Getafe CF. He made his debut about a week later, coming on as a second half-substitute in a 2–0 away loss against Rayo Vallecano.

Goitom only totalled 125 minutes of action during his spell, and his team suffered top-flight relegation.

San Jose Earthquakes
On 10 August 2016, Goitom joined San Jose Earthquakes on a free transfer. He made his Major League Soccer debut nine days later, coming from the bench in a 1–2 defeat to Houston Dynamo at the Avaya Stadium.

At the end of the season, where he only started in two of his appearances, it was announced that Goitom would not be retained.

Return to AIK
On 3 March 2017, Goitom signed a two-year deal with former side AIK, thus returning to his birth country and its main division. In February of the following year, he became team captain.

Goitom announced his retirement after the 2021 season, aged 37. On 19 August 2022, he was appointed interim manager of his last club.

International career

Sweden
Goitom was a regular starter for the Swedish under-21 team during 2006, and played for the nation during qualification for the 2006 and 2007 UEFA European Championships. He was never called up to the full side, although he was considered for a place in the squad for a Euro 2016 qualifier against Russia.

Eritrea
In September 2015, at age of 30, Goitom made an official request to FIFA for permission to play for Eritrea. He made his debut on 10 October, in a 2–0 home loss to Botswana for the 2018 FIFA World Cup qualifiers. He scored in the return leg, in a final 5–1 aggregate defeat.

Career statistics

Club

International
Appearances and goals by national team and year

International goals
Scores and results list Eritrea's goal tally first.

Honours
AIK
Allsvenskan: 2018

References

External links

1984 births
Living people
People from Solna Municipality
Swedish people of Eritrean descent
Sportspeople from Stockholm County
Eritrean footballers
Swedish footballers
Association football forwards
Allsvenskan players
Essinge IK players
Vasalunds IF players
AIK Fotboll players
Serie A players
Udinese Calcio players
La Liga players
Segunda División players
Ciudad de Murcia footballers
Real Murcia players
Real Valladolid players
UD Almería players
Getafe CF footballers
Major League Soccer players
San Jose Earthquakes players
Sweden youth international footballers
Sweden under-21 international footballers
Eritrea international footballers
Eritrean expatriate footballers
Swedish expatriate footballers
Expatriate footballers in Italy
Expatriate footballers in Spain
Expatriate soccer players in the United States
Eritrean expatriate sportspeople in Spain
Swedish expatriate sportspeople in Italy
Swedish expatriate sportspeople in Spain
Eritrean football managers
Swedish football managers
Allsvenskan managers
AIK Fotboll managers